Santa Cruz Diner is a diner located on Ocean Street in Santa Cruz, California.

History
Santa Cruz Diner was founded by Larry Ring in 1998.

Cuisine

Santa Cruz Diner combines East coast diner cuisine with Asian dishes.

In popular culture
In 2009, Santa Cruz Diner was featured on the 7th season of Diners, Drive-Ins and Dives and again on the 21st season in 2014.

References

Companies based in Santa Cruz, California
1998 establishments in California